Reindustrialization is the economic, social, and political process of organizing national resources for the purpose of re-establishing industries. The process proceeds as a result of a need to reinvigorate national economies.

Interpretations
China, India and South-East Asia were industrial powerhouses for major parts of human history. These countries and regions suffered great loss of industrial production due to colonization during the 18th-20th centuries. After many decades of independence, these countries have started reindustrializing themselves. In the last three decades, the share of these countries in global industrial output has increased manyfold.
 
In context of declining share of OECD in world GDP and outsourcing of manufacturing and services, reindustrialization is considered as a contrast to deindustrialization, the process under which industry, especially manufacturing, is relocated outside of a country's borders, and seeks to reverse that trend.

No longer the preserve of BRICs or South-East Asian countries, the notion of reindustrialization seems to be making inroads in the political discourse of populist policy makers in the developed economies of Western Europe and North America, notably France and the United States, where the rise of Trumponomics may potentially challenge some of the free trade tenets of the neoliberal "Washington Consensus".

In 2021 French President Emmanuel Macron revealed a 30-billion euro plan to "revitalize and reindustrailize" France by focusing on green energy, the semiconductor industry and the medicine industry. In his speech Macron highlighted the need to develop the neglected French industry to a decarbonised and efficient model.

 In context of Asian economies, reindustrialization is a natural process of economic growth in which former industrial powerhouses China, India and South-East Asia are re-establishing their economies
 Advocates of reindustrialization believe that manufacturing and other industrial jobs are more socially and economically desirable than jobs in the service sector or finance.
 Military or national security concerns motivate reindustrialization policies, reflecting a desire for self-sufficiency and fear for trade routes and supply lines in times of conflict. 
 Reindustrialization policies may reflect concerns over the balance of trade.

See also
 Deindustrialization
 Electrification
 Green industrial policy
 Protectionism
 Retrofitting
 Solar thermal energy

References

Further reading
 Khanna, Ro, "The New Industrial Age: America Should Once Again Become a Manufacturing Superpower", Foreign Affairs, vol. 102, no. 1 (January/February 2023), pp. 141–154.

Secondary sector of the economy
Economic growth
Industrialisation